The New Generation Rollingstock (NGR) is a class of individually-propelled carriages ("electric multiple units") manufactured by Bombardier Transportation in Savli, India for the Queensland Rail City network that entered service between December 2017 and December 2019. They are Queensland Rail's largest fleet of electric trains.

History

In January 2014, the Queensland Government awarded a contract for 75 six-carriage electric multiple units to the Qtectic consortium of Aberdeen Asset Management, Bombardier Transportation, Itochu and John Laing under a 32-year public private partnership. They are the first QR electric multiple units not manufactured in Maryborough by Downer Rail (formerly Walkers).

The NGRs were built in Savli, India. The design is completely new, and the trains are fitted with nose cones to resemble the existing Electric Tilt Trains for improved aerodynamic performance as opposed to the exposed Scharfenberg couplers used by the existing fleet. The body style differs using flat steel panels on the sides, while retaining corrugated panels for the rooftop. The first arrived at the Port of Brisbane in February 2016.

The first three entered service on 11 December 2017 on the Airport and Gold Coast lines. By the time of the Commonwealth Games in April 2018, eight had entered service.

Because of the NGRs' non-compliance with disability legislation, all platforms they serve are required to be staffed. Initially confined to the Airport and Gold Coast lines, in May 2018 they began operating on the Doomben line, followed by Roma Street to Northgate services in July and Redcliffe and Springfield line services in September. In October 2018, they began operating on the Ipswich and Caboolture lines. In February 2019, they began to operate to Shorncliffe and Cleveland. The same month, the NGRs became the largest fleet of electric trains in Queensland. In March 2020 they commenced operating on the Sunshine Coast line to Nambour.

As of March 2020, they operate passenger services across the City network except for the Beenleigh, Ferny Grove and Rosewood lines.

NGRs will not operate on Sunshine Coast line services north of Nambour until signalling upgrades to Gympie North have been completed. Currently trains are required to compatible with the operation of Automatic Train Protection which isn't fitted on the NGRs. The last NGR, unit 775, entered service in January 2020.

Operation
The NGRs are maintained at a purpose built depot to the west of Wulkuraka station. Once modifications are complete, the new trains will allow all of the Electric Multiple Unit fleet and InterCity Express sets to be withdrawn. The trains increase the size of the fleet by 26%. The NGRs feature high-backed seats, safety straps for bike storage, luggage space underneath the seats unlike the Interurban Multiple Units that have luggage racks, mobility toilet with baby changing table, free public WiFi and CCTV.

Each NGR unit comprises two driving motor cars (prefixes 3 and 8) at each end, coupled to two trailer cars (prefixes 4 and 7) and two intermediate motor cars in the middle (prefixes 5 and 6, with Motor car B currently featuring the toilet module on original trains and both on upgraded trains).

As they are permanently coupled six-car units, passengers are able to walk the entire length of the train, consequently eliminating the need to couple with another unit. Guards travel at the rear as opposed to the middle with the existing fleet, where two three-car units couple to form a six-car unit. Utilising the same traction equipment based on Bombardier Aventras as well as being compatible with the European Train Control System, the NGR (as well as upgraded SMU 260 sets) will be the only trains permitted to travel in the Cross River Rail tunnels.

NGR units are also noted to have contain Gangway connection doors but are almost never used.
PIS screens on the platform shows an NGR Icon for that service if the service is being operated by an NGR train.

Accessibility improvements
Work to rectify the non-compliant parts of the trains was performed by Downer Rail's Maryborough facility. After an exemption application to the Australian Human Rights Commission was rejected, the need for rectification was clear. The first arrived at Maryborough for rectification work in January 2019. So far 34 units (706, 708 - 713, 718, 719, 724, 726, 727, 729 - 731, 733, 735, 738, 740, 745, 746, 748 - 750, 752, 753, 756, 758, 760, 764, 765, and 767 - 769) have been completed, approximately 1/3 of the total NGR fleet. The project is scheduled for completion in 2024.

The rectification work solves the disability access problem by providing a toilet module for both centre (wheelchair accessible) cars. This means that wheelchairs no longer have to travel around the toilets to access them from behind. No major changes were made to the general seating other than recovering some of the seats with priority labelling including some transverse seats with high backs and no arm rests.

More help points were added in the space between the two toilet modules.

The toilet modules were made disability compliant by moving the toilet front side and door at least  closer to the external doors, while leaving the toilet bowl in the original location. Labelling and other minor changes were made in the toilet module as well, such as the installation of lights that warn in the event of an evacuation.

These trains can be easily identified by the large priority stickers on the windows all along the train. More stickers are present within the train as well.

Some changes were made to signage throughout the train on the advice of disability groups; purportedly as "better wording" but the differences would be minor to the average person - intended instead for the minority of people with literacy difficulties (see difference between green emergency door release wording above).

References

External links

 

Bombardier Transportation multiple units
Electric multiple units of Queensland
Queensland Rail City network
Train-related introductions in 2017
25 kV AC multiple units